Jacek Kaspszyk (born 10 August 1952) is a Polish music conductor and was the Music and Artistic Director of the Warsaw National Philharmonic Orchestra from 2013 until the close of the 2018/2019 season.

In 2012, he was awarded the Elgar Medal. In 2014 Jacek Kaspszyk won the cultural award of Gazeta Wyborcza, the supplement "What is played" – "Inhale Audience" in the category "Man of the Year".

References 

1952 births
Living people
Polish conductors (music)
Male conductors (music)
21st-century conductors (music)
21st-century male musicians